Cantel is a municipality in the Quetzaltenango Department in Guatemala. It is located east of the city of Quetzaltenango and has an area of 52.6 km2. The town of Cantel, with a population of 35,825 (2018 census), is situated at an altitude of 2,370 metres.

Cantel includes the small Maya archaeological sites of Chojolom and Cerro Quiac.

References

External links

Website of Cantel

Municipalities of the Quetzaltenango Department